B83 may refer to :
 B83 nuclear bomb
 HLA-B*83, an HLA-B serotype
 B83 (New York City bus) in Brooklyn
 Sicilian Defence, Scheveningen Variation, Encyclopaedia of Chess Openings code